Fabien Tissot (born 14 November 1972) is a French former professional footballer who played as a forward.

During his playing career, Tissot made over 100 appearances in Ligue 2 for Nancy, Beauvais and Épinal. He assisted Saint-Dizier for seven seasons between 2002 and 2009, and was the club's player-manager in the 2008–09 campaign. He has since gone on to manage Épinal, Progrès Niederkorn and Bourgoin-Jallieu.

References

1972 births
Living people
Sportspeople from Nancy, France
French footballers
Association football forwards
AS Nancy Lorraine players
SAS Épinal players
AS Beauvais Oise players
Stade de Reims players
Ligue 2 players
French football managers
CO Saint-Dizier players
FC Progrès Niederkorn managers
SAS Épinal managers
Footballers from Grand Est
French expatriate football managers
Expatriate football managers in Luxembourg
French expatriate sportspeople in Luxembourg